Can't Buy a Miracle is an album by Randy Stonehill, released in 1988 on Myrrh Records.

Track listing
All songs written by Randy Stonehill and Dave Perkins except where otherwise noted.

Side one
 "It's Now"  – 4:03
 "Don't Break Down" (Stonehill) – 3:04
 "Coming Back Soon" (Stonehill) – 4:46
 "O How The Mighty Have Fallen"  – 4:10
 "Brighter Day" (Stonehill) – 4:05

Side two
 "Awfully Loud World"  – 3:02
 "Cold Rock The Groove" (Randy Stonehill, Dave Perkins, Greg Husted) – 4:05
 "Beyond The Veil"  – 4:55
 "Can't Buy A Miracle"  – 3:49

The Subterraneans 
 Randy (Life O'Reilly, Randall the Vandall) Stonehill – vocals, flat top guitars
 Greg (Lord Louie, Greg, Atticus Finch) Husted – keyboards
 Dave (Atilla the Lung, Tweakmeister Rex) Perkins – electric guitars
 Rick (Wrap Around, Magnum Vibrato, How Ya Doin') Cua – bass guitar
 Mike (Mosquito, Twinkie Shrapnel, Monkey Boy) Mead – drums
 Lisa (Lisa Lisa, Lisa Lisa Lisa) Cates – percussion

Backing vocals 
 Gary Chapman on "Brighter Day"
 Phil Keaggy on Don't Break Down"
 Rez Band (Glenn and Wendi Kaiser) on "Cold Rock The Groove"
 Russ Taff on "Awfully Loud World"
 Dave (Ronnie) Perkins on "Miracle," "Awfully Loud World"

Production 
 Executive Producers – Ray Ware and Tom Willett
 Produced by Dave Perkins
 Recorded at "The Tube" (Reelsound Bus) Somewhere up at tree in Rutland. 
 Engineered by Malcolm (Chairman Mal) Harper and Dave Perkins
 Mixed at The Reelsound Truck (Austin, Texas).
 Mixed by Dave Perkins and Malcolm (Malcolm X, Y, Z) Harper
 Additional Engineering – Lynn Fuston and Dave (Flood-master, "don't call me Shirley") Shirley
 Services – Jim and Kim (said so) Thomas
 Art – Ph. D/Michael ("It needs strings - that I do know!") Hodgson
 Photos – Peter Nash

References

1988 albums
Randy Stonehill albums